A. T. M. Abdul Wahab is a Bangladesh Awami League politician and the former Member of Parliament from Magura-1.

Early life
Wahab was born on 29 December 1946. He fought in the Bangladesh Liberation war as the sub-sector commander of Sector Eight.

Career
Wahab retired from Bangladesh Army with the rank of major general. He wrote a book, Mukti Bahini Wins Victory: Military Oligarchy Divides Pakistan in 1971, about the history of the Bangladesh Liberation war.

Wahab was elected to Parliament in 2015 from Magura-1 as a candidate of Bangladesh Awami League in a by-election. The by-election were called after the death of the incumbent Member of Parliament, Muhammad Serajul Akbar. He was selected out of 17 potential candidates interviewed by Awami League Parliamentary Board.

References

Awami League politicians
Living people
1946 births
10th Jatiya Sangsad members
Bangladesh Army generals
Mukti Bahini personnel
People from Magura District